Ron Johnson (born May 23, 1980) is a former American football and Arena football wide receiver. He was drafted by the Baltimore Ravens in the fourth round of the 2002 NFL Draft. He played college football at Minnesota.

Johnson was also a member of the Chicago Bears, Washington Redskins, Calgary Stampeders, Orlando Predators, and Cleveland Gladiators.

Johnson's father Ron Johnson Sr. played in the NFL as a defensive back for the Pittsburgh Steelers, winning two Super Bowls between 1978 and 1984.

References

External links
Cleveland Gladiators bio

1980 births
Living people
American football wide receivers
American football tight ends
Canadian football wide receivers
African-American players of American football
African-American players of Canadian football
Minnesota Golden Gophers football players
Baltimore Ravens players
Chicago Bears players
Washington Redskins players
Calgary Stampeders players
Orlando Predators players
Cleveland Gladiators players
21st-century African-American sportspeople
20th-century African-American people